A parts book or parts catalogue or Illustrated part catalogue is a book published by manufacturers which contains the illustrations, part numbers and other relevant data for their products or parts thereof.

Parts books were often also issued as microfiche, though this has fallen out of favour. Now, many manufacturers offer this information digitally in an electronic parts catalogue. This can be locally installed software, or a centrally hosted web application. Usually, an electronic parts catalogue enables the user to virtually disassemble the product into its components to identify the required part(s).

In the automotive industry, electronic parts catalogues are also able to access specific vehicle information, usually through an online look-up of the vehicle identification number. This will identify specific models, allowing the user to correctly identify the required part and its relevant part number.

See also
ETKA
Product information management
Parts locator
Electronic Parts Catalogue (EPC)

Sources
 https://www.skybrary.aero/index.php/Illustrated_Parts_Catalogue
 Catalog Design Handbook – Marketing Principles so as typography and printing industry standards applied to catalog design

Manufacturing
Automotive industry